William Kirby Bryan (born June 21, 1955) is a former American football player in the National Football League (NFL). He was drafted by the Denver Broncos in the  fourth round of the 1977 NFL Draft out of Duke University. Bryan holds the second-longest NFL career for Duke graduates, behind only to Sonny Jurgensen. He went on to play for the Broncos from 1977 to 1988 and was All-Pro in 1985. In his career as a member of the Broncos, Bryan played 153 games.

Honors and awards
 Duke Blue Devils football
 1976 All-America honors 
 Atlantic Coast Conference Jacobs Blocking Trophy
 Denver Broncos
 Participated in 4 Super Bowls
 All-Pro in 1985
 13 seasons in the National Football League

References

1955 births
Living people
American football centers
Duke Blue Devils football players
Denver Broncos players
People from Burlington, North Carolina
Players of American football from North Carolina